The 1961 World Table Tennis Championships – Corbillon Cup (women's team) was the 19th edition of the women's team championship. 

Japan won the gold medal, China won the silver medal and Romania won the bronze medal.

Medalists

Final tables

Group 1

Group 2

Group 3

Final group

Final group matches

See also
List of World Table Tennis Championships medalists

References

-
1961 in women's table tennis